Careers is a board game first manufactured by Parker Brothers in 1955 for $2.97 US, and was most recently produced by Winning Moves Games.  It was devised by the sociologist James Cooke Brown.  Victory conditions (a secret "Success Formula") consist of a minimum amount of fame, happiness and money (designated as fortune and counted in thousands of dollars), that the player must gain.  Players (from two to six) set their own victory conditions before the game begins, the total of which must be sixty, or one hundred, recommended when only two are playing. 

So for example in a regular multi-player game you can set your goal to 20 hearts of happiness, 20 stars of fame, and 20 thousand dollars of fortune, or you could decide for example that you want 45 hearts, 15 thousand dollars and you are not interested in any fame.

Gameplay 
The square-shaped board consists of an outer track and several minor loops (called occupation paths), each of which starts and ends at a space on the outer track. Inside the occupation path you would accumulate or lose some of your fame happiness and fortune, until you reached your goal. There was a track for college where you received a degree, which would make your annual salary grow each time you made a full round of the board, and affect other aspects of the game as listed in the cards and on the board squares. 

Originally there were eight loops, but that was later simplified to six. Some fame, happiness and money ("victory points") can be obtained on the outer track.  These victory points can be obtained more quickly on the occupation paths.  Each occupation path has more opportunities for certain types of victory points than others (e.g., in Hollywood there are many opportunities to get fame points, but less for money or happiness).  Each occupation also has certain minimum entry requirements.

In the oldest versions of the game, players landing on a square occupied by another player are "knocked to the park bench" in one corner of the board, where they must throw a 2, 4, 5, 6, 7, 8, 10, 11, or 12 to move on. Another corner has a square for a "Bermuda holiday" where players throwing below 7 can stay and accumulate happiness points. Another corner has a square for hospital fees, which must be paid to the bank or to another player who has obtained a medical degree by going to the 'university' (later called 'college') occupation path.

Occupation paths offer opportunities to collect extra points and to increase the annual salary, which is collected when passing the start square, or doubled if a player lands on it.  However, there are a number of squares in the occupation paths with negative consequences, such as being sent to the park bench, having a salary cut or paying hospital fees.  Completion of an occupation path enables a player to pick up an 'experience' card, which they can use instead of rolling the dice.  These enable the player to move on one, two or three squares.  If a player completes a single occupation path several times, they can pick up multiple experience cards.

Other 'opportunity' cards are collected when landing on particular squares on the outer track which gives a player the option to move to an occupation path.  Some of these cards are special or golden opportunities and enable the player to begin the occupation path without the usual prerequisites (usually a payment, a particular degree or having completed another occupation path).

An unusual feature of this game compared to more modern board games is that individual players need to record much information on their own scoresheet, such as annual salary, degrees earned and number of times occupation paths have been completed.

Towards the end of the game, players can trade cards for money or other favors (such as not knocking to the park bench).

Reception
Games magazine included Careers in their "Top 100 Games of 1980", praising it as a "classic family game" that is "Good for two to six players".

Reviews
Games & Puzzles

References

External links
 - Obviously a parody from the 1990's pertaining to the rules and roles written for males.

Board games introduced in 1955
Economic simulation board games
Parker Brothers games
Pressman Toy Corporation games
Roll-and-move board games
Waddingtons games
Winning Moves games